Royal Air Force Worcester or more simply RAF Worcester is a former Royal Air Force relief landing ground (RLG) which was located  north east of Worcester city centre, Worcestershire, England and  south west of Droitwich Spa, Worcestershire.

Posted units

The following units were here at some point:
 No. 2 Elementary Flying Training School RAF (2 EFTS) became No. 6 (Supplementary) Flying Instructors School RAF became No. 6 Flying Instructors School RAF became No. 6 Flying Instructors School (Elementary) RAF became 2 EFTS
 No. 24 Group Communication Flight RAF
 No. 81 Group Communication Flight RAF
 No. 2790 Squadron RAF Regiment

Accidents and incidents

5 June 1940 Bristol Blenheim L1232 of No. 5 Operational Training Unit overshot at night and hit a house.

17 October 1941 de Havilland Tiger Moth T5856 of No. 2 Elementary Flying Training School (EFTS) crashed when landing.

15 July 1942 Miles Magister R1956 of No. 6 Flying Instructors School (FIS) hit a gunpost on take-off.

September 1942 Douglas Dakota en route from Pershore with a film crew crashed blocking the Bilford Road. The co-pilot was the American film actor Clark Gable who was involved with a planned gunnery training film.

16 May 1943 Airspeed Oxford R9983 of No. 15 (Pilots) Advanced Flying Unit RAF crashed on takeoff.

The airfield today
The airfield has been turned into Perdiswell Park and Ravenmeadow Golf Course.

References

Citations

Bibliography

External links
 BBC History – A Memory of Worcester During the War

Royal Air Force stations in Worcestershire
Military units and formations established in 1940
Royal Air Force stations of World War II in the United Kingdom